George Sickler (8 May 1891 – 26 February 1964) was a South African cricket umpire. He stood in seven Test matches between 1938 and 1948.

See also
 List of Test cricket umpires

References

1891 births
1964 deaths
Sportspeople from Cape Town
South African Test cricket umpires